Chromium(III) bromide is an inorganic compound with the chemical formula CrBr3. It is a dark colored solid that appears green in
transmitted light but red with reflected light.  It is used as a precursor to catalysts for the oligomerization of ethylene.

Synthesis
The compound is prepared in a tube furnace by the reaction of bromine vapor and chromium powder at 1000 °C.  It is purified by extracting with absolute diethyl ether to remove any CrBr2, and is subsequently washed with absolute diethyl ether and absolute ethanol.

Analogous to the behavior of related chromium(III) halides, the tribromide dissolves in water to give CrBr3(H2O)3 only upon the addition of catalytic amounts of a reducing agent, which generates CrBr2.  The reducing agent generates chromous bromide on the surface of the solid, which dissolves and re-oxidizes to Cr(III).

Reactions
Chromium(III) bromide is reduced by hydrogen gas at 350-400 °C to give chromium(II) bromide:
2CrBr3  +  H2  →   2CrBr2  +  2HBr

References

Chromium(III) compounds
Bromides
Metal halides